Ali Akbarlu (also Romanized as ‘Alī Akbarlū, ‘Alī Akbarloo, and ‘Alīakbarlū; also known as Alagper and ‘Alī Akbar) is a village in Mishu-e Jonubi Rural District, Sufian District, Shabestar County, East Azerbaijan Province, Iran. At the 2006 census, its population was 746, in 181 families.

References 

Populated places in Shabestar County